Saint Arialdo (c. 1010 – June 27, 1066) is a Christian saint of the eleventh century. He was assassinated because of his efforts to reform the Milanese clergy.

Life
Arialdo was the child of a noble family, born at Cutiacum (Cucciago), near Como. After studying in Laon and Paris, he was made a canon in the cathedral city of Milan. According to Andrea da Parma, abbot of San Fedele di Strumi, who wrote a Vita concerning Arialdo, the church in Milan was rife with immoral clerics, fornicating, sleeping with prostitutes, lending money, and selling indulgences. According to Henry Charles Lea. marriage was common place among the Milanese clergy. 

Together with Bishop of Lucca Anselmo da Baggio (later Pope Alexander II), Arialdo headed the pataria, a movement that sought to reform Milan's simoniacal clergy. Due to this, he was excommunicated by the Bishop of Milan Guido da Velate. Pope Stephen IX removed the excommunication and Arialdo returned to Milan to continue his efforts towards reformation. In 1069 the Pope sent Peter Damiani as legate to attempt a resolution. The issue then became less a matter of clerical conduct than the authority of Rome over Milan. Damiani was able to demonstrate that the city's beloved patron St Ambrose had acknowledged the precedence of the papacy.

Eventually, these endeavours lead to bishop Guido da Velate's excommunication. While traveling to Rome, Arialdo was set up by emissaries of Guido and killed.

Veneration
Ten months after the assassination, his body was found in Lago Maggiore (allegedly in a perfect state of preservation, and emitting a sweet odour). It was carried to Milan and exposed in the church of St. Ambrose from Ascension to Pentecost. Subsequently, Arialdo's body was interred in the church of St. Celsus, and in the following year, 1067, Pope Alexander II declared him a martyr.

See also
Roman Catholic Archdiocese of Milan

References

External links

 Archdiocese of Milan at the Catholic Encyclopedia
 Sant' Arialdo di Milano
 Sant’ Arialdo da Carimate

1010s births
1066 deaths
People from the Province of Como
11th-century Italian clergy
11th-century Christian saints
11th-century Christian martyrs
Medieval Italian saints